The Providence Friars women's basketball team represents Providence College in Providence, Rhode Island, United States. The school's team currently competes in the Big East where it has competed since the 1982–83 season. Under coach Kay McDonald, the women’s basketball team began competing in the EAIAW in 1974-75, obtaining a 9-4 record and its first winning season.

Yearly record
Source:

2013-14 BIG EAST Women's Basketball

2015-16 BIG EAST Women's Basketball

Postseason results

NCAA Division I

AIAW Division I
The Friars made one appearance in the AIAW National Division I basketball tournament, with a combined record of 0–1.

References

External links